Chauncey Brainerd Hammond (November 5, 1882 – February 11, 1952) was an American politician from New York.

Life
He was born on November 5, 1882, on the family's farm in the Town of Elmira, Chemung County, New York. He worked for the Erie Railroad.

He was a member of the New York State Assembly (Chemung Co.) in 1935, 1936, 1937, 1938 and 1939; and was Chairman of the Committee on Penal Institutions from 1938 to 1939. He resigned his seat on July 27, 1939, to run for the senate seat vacated by the suicide of C. Tracey Stagg.

Hammond was a member of the New York State Senate from 1940 until his death in 1952, sitting in the 162nd, 163rd, 164th, 165th, 166th, 167th and 168th New York State Legislatures.

He died during the legislative session on February 11, 1952, in his hotel room in Albany, New York; and was buried at the Woodlawn Cemetery in Elmira.

Sources

External links
 

1882 births
1952 deaths
Republican Party New York (state) state senators
Politicians from Elmira, New York
Republican Party members of the New York State Assembly
20th-century American railroad executives
20th-century American politicians